The Men's 3 m springboard competition of the 2020 European Aquatics Championships was held on 14 May 2021.

Results
The preliminary round was started at 12:00. The final was held at 20:25.

Green denotes finalists

References

Men's 3 m springboard